The ring leader of a cell responsible for conducting improvised explosive device attacks on the people and security forces of North Babil was captured by paratroopers south of Mahmudiyah, 11 July 2007.

Operation Details
The Paratroopers of Company C, 3rd Battalion, 509th Airborne, 4th Brigade Combat Team (Airborne), 25th Infantry Division conducted a raid named Operation Leyte Gulf and captured the cell leader and four of his lieutenants.

The paratroopers also confiscated an AK47 automatic rifle with five magazines of ammunition, four hunting knives, and a set of binoculars.

The cell members were detained for further questioning.

The weapons and other materials were confiscated for use in the investigation.

Participating Units

American Units
 Company C, 3rd Battalion, 509th Airborne, 4th Brigade Combat Team (Airborne), 25th Infantry Division; along with elements of B Company, 425th STB (Special Troops Battalion), 4th Brigade Combat Team (Airborne), 25th Infantry Division.

See also

Iraq War
List of coalition military operations of the Iraq War
Terrorism
Iraq Insurgency
List of bombings during the Iraq War
United States military casualties of war
Post-traumatic stress disorder
Iraq Body Count project
Violence against academics in post-invasion Iraq

References

 Leyte Gulf

Military operations of the Iraq War in 2007
Military operations of the Iraq War involving the United States
Military operations of the Iraq War involving Iraq